The Kansas City, Clay County and St. Joseph Railway was an electrified interurban railway that ran between Kansas City, Missouri, and St. Joseph, Missouri, from the early 1900s until 1933.

The railway was built over the course of three years by electrical engineer George Townsend, brother to writer and congressman Edward W. Townsend and composer Cornelia Townsend. The interurban was a light rail system in which single cars traveled powered by an overhead electric wire.  The interurban ran hourly.  Fare was $1.55 and it took nearly two hours from downtown to downtown.  One line went from Kansas City to St. Joseph, another line went from Kansas City to Excelsior Springs.

The railway made Townsend wealthy. George Townsend killed himself in Kansas City, MO on June 24, 1913 by jumping into the Missouri River.

See also
List of interurbans

References

External links
Interurban road

Kansas City interurban railways
Clay County, Missouri
Platte County, Missouri
Buchanan County, Missouri
1933 disestablishments in Missouri
Defunct Missouri railroads
Transportation in Kansas City, Missouri
St. Joseph, Missouri